Gymnopilus latus is a species of mushroom in the family Hymenogastraceae.

See also

List of Gymnopilus species

External links
Gymnopilus latus at Index Fungorum

latus
Fungi of North America
Taxa named by William Alphonso Murrill